Ritchie Neil Ninian Robertson FBA (born 1952) is a British academic who was the Taylor Professor of German Language and Literature between 2010 and 2021. He was educated at Nairn Academy in the North of Scotland and at Edinburgh University, where he took two degrees, in English and German. He has been a Fellow of Queen's College, Oxford since 2010. He is a former Germanic Editor of The Modern Language Review. Professor Robertson co-directs the Oxford Kafka Research Centre with Carolin Duttlinger and Professor Katrin Kohl.

Bibliography
Kafka: Judaism, Politics, and Literature (Clarendon Press, 1985)
Heine (Peter Halban, 1988; Grove Press, 1988)
A History of Austrian Literature 1918-2000 (Rochester, NY: Camden House, 2006), editor, with Katrin Kohl
The "Jewish Question" in German Literature, 1749-1939 (Oxford: OUP, 1999)
The German-Jewish Dialogue: An Anthology of Literary Texts, 1749-1993 (Oxford World's Classics, 1999) , editor and translator
The Cambridge Companion to Thomas Mann (Cambridge University Press, 2002). , editor
Kafka: A Very Short Introduction (Oxford: OUP, 2004); illustrated edition titled Kafka: A Brief Insight (New York: Sterling Publishing Co., Inc., 2010)
Mock-Epic Poetry from Pope to Heine (Oxford: OUP, 2009)
The Enlightenment: The Pursuit of Happiness, 1680-1790 (New York: Harper, 2021)

References

Robertson, Ritchie
1952 births
Germanists
Fellows of St John's College, Oxford
Fellows of The Queen's College, Oxford
Taylor Professors of the German Language and Literature
Fellows of the British Academy